John Woolley (28 February 1816 – 11 January 1866) was an academic and clergyman, the first principal of the University of Sydney, Australia.

Early life
Woolley was born at Petersfield, Hampshire, England, the second son of George Woolley, physician, and his wife Charlotte, née Gell. Woolley attended Western Grammar School, Brompton, London and then the University College, London from 1830, and during the next two years passed every subject he took with first-class honours. Woolley then won an open scholarship at Exeter College, Oxford, graduating BA, 1836, with a first-class in classics, MA, 1839, and DCL in 1844. Woolley was ordained a deacon on 14 June 1840 and a priest on 4 July 1841. In 1840 Woolley published An Introduction to Logic. In 1842 he was appointed headmaster of Edward the Sixth's Grammar School, Hereford, and three years later held the same position at Rossall School in Lancashire. Woolley published Sermons Preached in the Chapel of Rossall College in 1847. He became headmaster of Norwich Grammar School in 1849, and in 1852 was appointed principal and professor of classics at the University of Sydney.

Australia
Woolley arrived in Sydney with his wife and daughters on 9 July 1852 and quickly started making arrangements for the opening of the University. The first matriculation examination was held in October, and 24 students were admitted to matriculation; teaching work began at once. Woolley afterwards added to his duties the teaching of logic. He had an extremely difficult task as principal. Parliament was unsympathetic, there were few students, and in many cases their preliminary schooling had been inadequate. One of the means of improving the position of the University that Woolley brought forward (not developed until after his death) was linking the primary education of the colony with the university. Woolley published a volume of Lectures Delivered in Australia (1862), some of which had been given at the Sydney Mechanics' School of Arts, Sydney, and similar institutions. Woolley gratuitously held classes at the mechanics' school of arts and endeavoured to expand the classes there into a regular curriculum of studies, and though in 1860 he had to admit the comparative failure of the attempt, after his death more was done in this area. In 1882, 1100 Pupils were attending classes. (Commemorative address on the celebration of the fiftieth anniversary by Sir William Windeyer).

Late life and legacy
Woolley took leave and left for England on 26 December 1864 aboard HMS Miranda. There he visited friends and relations. On his way back to Australia, Woolley was drowned in the Bay of Biscay when the SS London sank on 11 January 1866. Woolley married in July 1842 Mary Margaret, daughter of Major William Turner, who survived him with six children. A sum of £2000 was raised by subscription among his friends and presented to his widow.

Woolley was regarded as a scholarly and amiable man. J. Sheridan Moore's lecture on The Life and Genius of James Lionel Michael contains a glowing reference to Woolley. Henry Barff, in A Short Historical Account of the University of Sydney, speaks highly of his scholarship and enthusiasm, and of the work he did in the forming of the university and the moulding of young men's minds throughout the colony. Woolley however, found it almost impossible to make the young university take its proper place in the life of the colony. It was not until several years after his death that the number of students reached 100.

The John Woolley building at the University of Sydney is named in his honour. It currently houses the School of Art, Communication and English.

References

1816 births
1866 deaths
Academic staff of the University of Sydney
Headmasters of Rossall School
Headmasters of Norwich School
English emigrants to colonial Australia
Deaths due to shipwreck at sea